Dhu Varren (Irish: Dúbhearn) is a railway halt in the townland of Glenmanus at the western edge of Portrush in County Antrim, Northern Ireland. It is an unstaffed halt on the Coleraine-Portrush railway line, less than a mile from the terminus, with a single platform.

It was opened on 10 February 1969 mainly to cater for travel to the station at Coleraine University.

Service
Monday to Friday, the first 2 trains from Portrush are through trains to Great Victoria street then the rest of the day an hourly service operates to Coleraine and Portrush

On Saturdays, the first train from Portrush is a through train to Great Victoria street.For the rest of the day, an hourly service operates to Coleraine and Portrush

On Sunday, there is an hourly service to Portrush and Coleraine, and a service extension to Great Victoria street every two hours.

References

1969 establishments in Northern Ireland
Railway stations in County Londonderry
Railway stations opened in 1969
Railway stations served by NI Railways
Portrush
Railway stations in Northern Ireland opened in the 20th century